Xewkija Heliport , also known as Gozo Heliport, is a small heliport on the island of Gozo in Malta, near the town of Xewkija.

Facilities

As of 2021, It is being examined if the current short runway could be expanded to allow fixed-wing aircraft STOL to land at Xewkija.

Flights
There used to be scheduled helicopter flights between Malta International Airport and Xewkija Heliport. These were started by Malta Air Charter in 1990, which ceased to operate in 2004. From March 2005 until October 2006 the flights were done by Helicópteros del Sureste. Currently, no scheduled flights take place from the heliport. However, Heli Link Malta offers flights between the heliport and Malta on request.

External links
 Airliners.net - Photos taken at Xewkija Heliport

References 

Heliports in Malta
Xewkija